Ann Thomson (born 1933) is an Australian painter and sculptor. She is best known for her large-scale public commissions Ebb Tide (1987) for the Sydney Convention and Exhibition Centre and Australia Felix (1992) for the Seville World Expo. In 1998 she won the [Art Gallery of New South Wales' Wynne Prize. Her work is held in national and international collections, including: the National Gallery of Australia, Canberra; Art Gallery of New South Wales, Sydney, Newcastle Art Gallery, Newcastle, Thyssen-Bornemisza Collection, Madrid and Villa Haiss Museum, Germany.

Early life and education
Ann Thomson was born in 1933 in Brisbane. She went to Somerville House, a private school in Brisbane also attended by Margaret Olley, Betty Churcher and art historian Joan Kerr. After school, she took painting classes with Richard Rodier Rivron and Jon Molvig. In 1957, Thomson moved to Sydney where she studied at the East Sydney Technical College (now the National Art School), graduating in 1962. She focused on drawing, sculpture and painting. During her education, she was taught by Godfrey Miller, John Passmore, John Olsen, Lyndon Dadswell, Davis Strachan and Dorothy Thornhill. While a young artist she also visited leading Australian modernist Ian Fairweather on Bribie Island, Queensland.

Career
Thomson sold her first painting through Clune Gallery, in Sydney. Her first commercial exhibition in 1965 was with Watters Gallery, Sydney, a significant venue for experimental works. In 1977, Thomson had a solo exhibition at the Institute of Modern Art in Brisbane.

In 1983, Thomson's work Pentaplain was a finalist in the Art Gallery of New South Wales' Wynne Prize for landscape paintings. The work is part figurative, with references to built structures, and part abstract with large areas of blue and green. It combines aerial and horizontal perspectives. 15 years later, she won the Wynne Prize with her work Yellow sound. This brilliant yellow oil on canvas combines various mark-making techniques including drips, layering and erasure. Her major commission Australia Felix was the central sculptural installation for the Australian Pavilion at the 1992 World Expo in Seville. The 11-metre wide work was subsequently installed at Sydney Darling Harbour. She has also won the Geelong Contemporary Art Prize (2002), and the Tattersall's Art Prize, Brisbane (2016).

In 1989, Thomson was one of 12 artists who participated in Mike Parr's But Now I Would Like to Speak as an Artist. The work involved the artists digging holes in the ground to bury their heads in for as long as possible.

In 2015 she was honoured with a Fellowship by the National Art School, Sydney. NAS followed this with an exhibition titled Ann Thomson and Contemporaries. The two-level gallery dedicated the upper floor to Thomson. Craig Judd favourably reviewed the exhibition, writing: "Ann Thomson and Contemporaries is a richly enjoyable exhibition". It "confirms without doubt the stature of Ann Thomson within the canons of Australian abstract art as teacher, mentor and leader".

In 2020, Thomson was among 500 artists calling on the Australian Government to support creatives through COVID-19.

As of 2012, Thomson was painting every day, generally working on multiple canvases at once and painting from memory, rather than directly from real life. Her earlier works were aligned with Abstract expressionism, while her later works oscillate between abstraction and figuration, taking inspiration from the landscape. Thomson says: "I don't feel as though I am totally abstract" and "I might abstract something but I don't just paint shapes".

Thomson continues to exhibit, making for a career of solo exhibitions that extends beyond half a century.

Recognition and awards
1976: David Jones Art Prize, Brisbane
1978: Visual Arts Board Grant to Cité internationale des Arts, Paris
1980: Visual Arts Board Grant
1981: Winner, Canberra Times National Art Award
1984: University of New South Wales Purchase Prize
1985: The Sydney Morning Herald Art Prize
1986: John McCaughey Prize
1998: Wynne Prize, Art Gallery of New South Wales, Sydney
2002: Geelong Contemporary Art Prize for Change Takes Time
2005: Kedumba Drawing Prize
2017: Tattersalls Art Prize, Brisbane.

Major exhibitions
1965: Watters Gallery, Sydney
1973: Gallery One Eleven, Brisbane
1974: Gallery A, Sydney
1977: Institute of Modern Art, Brisbane
1977: Gallery A, Sydney
1979: Gallery A, Sydney
1980: Monash University, Melbourne
1982: Gallery A, Sydney
1988: Australian Galleries, Melbourne
1989: Australian Galleries, Melbourne
1992: Australian Galleries, Sydney
1993: Australian Galleries, Melbourne, in conjunction with Meridian Sculpture Gallery
1993: Art Gallery of NSW Sculpture 'Australia Felix'
1994: Australian Galleries, Sydney

References

External links
 Mitchell Fine A
Art Gallery webpage
 Artist Profile
 Charles Nodrum Gallery
 Ann Thomson QAGOMA Collection holdings
 Art Gallery of NSW 'The art that made me: Ann Thomson' post

Australian women artists
Australian artists
Living people
1933 births
Artists from Brisbane
Australian women painters